Shams al-Mulk Nasr was a Karakhanid ruler in Transoxiana from 1068 to 1080. He was one of the greatest rulers of the dynasty.

Biography 

He was the son of Böritigin, a Karakhanid ruler from the western branch of the family, known as the "Alids", which was named after their ancestor Ali ibn Musa Qara Khan. 

Shams al-mulk is known for its buildings in the Zerafshan valley. Shams al-mulk built the palace and gardens of Shamsabad in Bukhara, where the Karakhanids later lived. The palace was located southwest of the Magok-i-Attari Mosque, outside the Bukhara. 
Shams al-Mulk was the first ruler of the city to build a royal residence outside the rabad of the city, on the site of the current Namazgah. 

One of the most important Karakhanid structures, most of which survived at the beginning of the 20th century, is Rabati Malik. It is located in Navoi, 110 km northeast of Bukhara on the road to Samarkand. The complex was greatly expanded in 1078–1079 by Shams al-Mulk.  

During the reign of Shams al- mulk, Omar Khayyam was invited to Samarkand.

Shams al-Mulk died in 1080 and was succeeded by his brother Khizr-khan.

References

Sources 
 
 
 
 Kochnev B.D. Numizmaticheskaya istoriya Karakhanidskogo kaganata (991—1209 gg.). Moskva «Sofiya», 2006.
 McClary, Richard Piran. Medieval Monuments of Central Asia: Qarakhanid Architecture of the 11th and 12th Centuries. Edinburgh University Press, 2020.

Further reading 
 

1080 deaths
Turkic rulers
11th-century Turkic people
Year of birth unknown
11th-century rulers in Asia